Paul S. Amenta (September 30, 1922 – December 8, 2014) was an American politician.

Born in New Britain, Connecticut, Amenta served in the United States Army Air Forces as a pilot during World War II. In 1947, he received his bachelor's degree from  New Britain Teachers College (now Central Connecticut State University). He was the legislative director of the American Federation of State, County, and Municipal Workers. Amenta also served on the Connecticut State Board of Education for thirty years. Amenta served in the Connecticut State Senate in 1953, 1955, 1965, 1967, 1969, and 1975, as a Democrat.

Notes

1922 births
2014 deaths
Politicians from New Britain, Connecticut
United States Army Air Forces pilots of World War II
Military personnel from Connecticut
Central Connecticut State University alumni
Connecticut State Board of Education members
Democratic Party Connecticut state senators